Pavan Duggal is an advocate practising in the Supreme Court of India, specializing in the field of Cyberlaw, Cybercrime Law, Cybersecurity Law, and Artificial Intelligence Law. He is a member of NOMNOM Committee on Multilingual Internet Names Consortium (MINC).

He is the President of Cyberlaws.Net. He has worked in mobile law, convergence law and dark net law. He is the president of Cyberlaw Asia.

Duggal is the Conference Director  of the International Conference on Cyberlaw, Cybercrime & Cybersecurity   organized by Cyberlaws.Net.

Duggal is the Chairman of the International Commission on Cyber Security Law.

Committees 
He has been a member of number of committees: 
 Member of the Permanent Monitoring Panel on "The Future of Cyber Security" of the World Federation of Scientists, an organization active in the framework of ICSC – International Centre for Scientific Culture - World Laboratory.
 Permanent Monitoring Panel (PMP) on Information Security, established by World Federation of Scientists
 The ICANN Nominating Committee representing the Asia Pacific region, 2003 and 2004.
Membership Advisory Committee of The Internet Corporation for Assigned Names and Numbers (ICANN).
  Advisory Council of the Institute of Cyber Security and Law of University of Delhi
 Chairman, Confederation of Indian Industry Delhi Panel on Cyber Security

Duggal has been contributing to the evolving legal jurisprudence on Artificial Intelligence, through his books on artificial intelligence and also through his course on Artificial Intelligence legalities.

He has contributed to academic discussions and debate evolving Artificial Intelligence jurisprudence. He has broadly highlighted the importance of Artificial Intelligence in the context of judicial systems. He commented:

Role in Evolving Metaverse Law 

Duggal is the Chief Evangelist of Metaverse Law Nucleus.

Books and recognition 

He has written several books/eBooks on various diverse and complex aspects concerning the legalities of policy related issues impacting cyberspace, Internet and the World Wide Web. He has authored India's first mobile law treatise, which focuses on litigation and jurisprudence vis-à-vis mobile communication devices.

As per the International Telecommunications Union, as a Writer, he has made his mark with 179 Books on various aspects of the law in the last 20 years. Dr. Pavan Duggal’s books have been conferred various awards by Book Authority in various categories over a couple of years.

He has authored 179 books on the intersection of law and technology over the last two and a half decades. The vast and diverse range of  Pavan Duggal’s books include Books on Cyber Law,  Cybercrime Law,  Cyber Security Law, Artificial Intelligence Law,  Blockchain Law,  Internet of Things Law,  Other Emerging Technologies and Legalities and on Coronavirus & Cyber Legal Issues.

The World Summit on the Information Society gives details of numerous books authored by Dr. Pavan Duggal on the website of the International Telecommunications Union.

Pavan Duggal’s numerous books have been recognized by BookAuthority.

Numerous Book Authority Awards have been conferred To Duggal’s Books.

References

External links
 Pavan Duggal's Homepage
 Cyberlaw University Homepage
 Cyberlaws.Net Homepage
 International Conference on Cyberlaw, Cybercrime & Cyber Security Homepage
 International Commission on Cyber Security Law Homepage
 Artificial Intelligence Law Hub Homepage
 Blockchain Law Epicentre Homepage
 Pavan Duggal Associates Homepage

Indian legal writers
Living people
20th-century Indian lawyers
Year of birth missing (living people)